Open Doors is a non-denominational mission supporting persecuted Christians in the world. They work with local partners to distribute Bibles and Christian literature, give discipleship training and provide practical support, such as emergency relief aid. Open Doors' stated aims are to raise awareness of global persecution, mobilising prayer, support and action among Christians from around the world. It is based in Ermelo, The Netherlands.  Open Doors is also a member of the Forum of Bible Agencies International.

History
Open Doors was founded in 1955 by Andrew van der Bijl, a Dutchman more widely known as Brother Andrew, when he decided to smuggle Bibles to persecuted Christians in Communist Poland. He continued this work in smuggling Bibles to many of the Soviet-controlled countries and in 1957 was given a blue Volkswagen Beetle which he used to make deliveries within the Communist bloc. With this new car he was able to carry more literature. Thereafter, the work of Open Doors continued to expand as it extended its network throughout Eastern Europe and the Soviet Union. The name "Open Doors" referencing that of a welcoming group due to the doors being open at all times. He was responsible for smuggling millions of Bibles behind the Iron Curtain.

On 18 June 1981, Open Doors delivered one million contraband Chinese Bibles in one night to a beach near the city of Shantou in southern China on a mission they named Project Pearl. Project Pearl was carried out by an international crew of 20, led by Brother David. A semi-submersible, 137-foot barge, named Gabriella, was loaded with 232 waterproof, poly-wrapped, one-ton packages containing a million Chinese Bibles. A 97-foot tugboat named Michael was used to tow Gabriella to the beach, weaving through a maze of anchored Chinese navy ships. The crew arrived at the beach at 9 pm. 10,000 Chinese Christians had gathered to bring the Bibles to shore and then deliver them all over China. Time magazine described Project Pearl as "A remarkable mission… the largest operation of its kind in the history of China."

In 1988, Open Doors used Glasnost as an opportunity to openly provide one million Russian Bibles to the Russian Orthodox Church, at a cost of $2.5 million.  Open Doors partnered with the United Bible Societies to complete the task in just over one year.

In 2005, 428,856 people from over 70 different countries signed Open Doors' global Right to Believe petition, saying Yes to religious liberty and No to the UN's Defamation of Religions Resolution. The petition was presented to the UN in New York in December 2010.

In 2015, Open Doors (including its affiliates) delivered 3 million Bibles and literature, and delivered relief and aid to 239,164 people. In 2018, the USA organization spent $19,291,134 on programs to the persecuted church with $4.7 M spent on fundraising and $2.8 on administration.

In 2022, it would have programs in 70 countries.

On September 27, 2022, Brother Andrew, the founder of Open Doors, died at age 94 at his home in Harderwijk, Netherlands.

Programs
Open Doors and its affiliates conduct programs in many countries:

 Delivering Bibles and other Christian literature
 Providing pastoral and discipleship training
 Conducting seminars on Christian living, family life. "Standing Strong Through the Storm" is the seminar they use to teach churches on how to survive under persecution.
 Running Bible-based literacy courses
 Supplying equipment and vocational training to help widows, families of prisoners of conscience, the displaced, and the unemployed to earn a living
 Providing legal aid and spiritual and emotional comfort to prisoners and their families
 Financing and supplying equipment to pastors, churches, and Bible colleges
 Supplying printing presses, radios, cassette players, photocopiers, and A/V and transport equipment
 Sponsoring Bible colleges, reconciliation ministries and restoration centres for Christian refugees, widows and orphans
 Acting as a "watchdog group" and reporting on the killing of Christians in various countries

World Watch List
The organization publishes an annual World Watch List which ranks countries by the severity of persecution faced by active Christians. The WWL is based on research and comparison of field researchers, external experts, academics, and publicly available research documents but is subjective. In 2012, the methodology of the WWL was comprehensively revised in order to provide greater credibility, transparency, objectivity and scientific quality. In 2013, further refinement of the methodology took place. Countries are ranked on a scale from 0 to 100 depending on persecution of church life, national life, community life, family life, private life and violence against Christians. Countries are categorized under "Extreme Persecution", "Very High Persecution" or "High Persecution". In 2021, all top 50 countries were in both the "Extreme Persecution" and "Very High Persecution" categories for the first time since the World Watch List was originally published. In 2022, Afghanistan overtook North Korea to become the country with the highest level of persecution. North Korea returned to the top of the list in 2023, with the highest levels of persecution ever seen. The report found Nigeria and Sub-Saharan Africa at the epicenter of violence against Christians. 

The 2023 list of 50 ranked countries:
Extreme levels of persecution 
 
 
 
 
 
 
 
 
 
 
 
Very high levels of persecution

See also
Anti-Christian sentiment
International Christian Concern
Religious intolerance
Religious persecution

References

External links
 

Christian missions
Christian charities
Christian organizations established in 1955
Persecution of Christians
International human rights organizations
Religious organisations based in the Netherlands
Bible smuggling
Non-profit organizations based in the United States
1955 establishments in the Netherlands